Richard Pánik (born 7 February 1991) is a Slovak professional ice hockey right winger for Lausanne HC of the Swiss National League (NL) on loan from the New York Islanders of the National Hockey League (NHL). Pánik was drafted in the second round, 52nd overall, in the 2009 NHL Entry Draft by the Tampa Bay Lightning.

Playing career

Junior
As a youth, Pánik played in the 2004 Quebec International Pee-Wee Hockey Tournament with a team from Bratislava.

Pánik played two years professionally for Oceláři Třinec of the Czech Extraliga before being drafted in the second round, 52nd overall, of the 2009 NHL Entry Draft by the Tampa Bay Lightning. Pánik attended the Lightning's training camp ahead of the 2009–10 season but was ultimately cut from their roster, after which he joined the Windsor Spitfires of the Ontario Hockey League (OHL). Later that season, Pánik played for Slovakia at the 2009 World Junior Ice Hockey Championships, where he scored two goals and three assists in five games.

On 5 January 2010, the Spitfires sent Pánik to the Belleville Bulls in a blockbuster trade, along with Austen Brassard, Steve Gleeson, Paul Bezzo, a second-round pick in 2012, a third-round pick in 2010 and a seventh-round pick in 2012, in exchange for Philipp Grubauer, Marc Cantin and Stephen Johnson.

Professional
Turning professional in 2011–12, Pánik was a member of the Norfolk Admirals team that set the longest win streak in professional hockey in North America, winning a record-breaking 28 consecutive victories that season. Pánik also helped the Admirals capture the Calder Cup championship in a 4–0 sweep over the Toronto Marlies.

Due to the 2012–13 NHL lockout that cancelled nearly half of the regular season, Tampa Bay assigned Pánik, as well as 17 others, to the Syracuse Crunch, the Lightning's new AHL affiliate for the 2012–13 season. On 11 February 2013, several weeks after NHL play had resumed, the Lightning recalled Pánik, where he later scored his first career NHL goal on 23 February against Dan Ellis of the Carolina Hurricanes in a 5–2 victory. On 1 March, the Tampa Bay Lightning reassigned Pánik to Syracuse after playing nine games in the NHL, registering one goal from eight shots on net. At the end of the AHL regular season, Pánik had played in 43 games with the Crunch, recording 21 goals and 35 points, including an AHL-high 12-game point streak from 2 November through 1 December 2013, with 17. Pánik then helped Syracuse reach the Calder Cup Final, though the team fell to the Grand Rapids Griffins in a 4–2 series defeat.

Pánik made the 2013–14 Lightning roster out of training camp to begin the regular season. Despite making the team, he saw his playing time dwindle as the season went on, however, and, after struggling to find consistency in his game, was demoted on 24 January 2014, to Syracuse. Several months later, on 5 March, Tampa Bay again recalled Pánik from the Crunch. He finished the regular season with 50 appearances for Tampa Bay, scoring three goals and ten assists for 13 points, in addition to Stanley Cup playoff games played against the Montreal Canadiens in the Eastern Conference Quarter-finals.

On 11 July 2014, Pánik signed a one-year, two-way contract extension with Tampa Bay. After failing to make the 2014–15 Lightning roster out of training camp, however, he was placed on waivers, where he was then claimed by the Toronto Maple Leafs on 9 October 2014. On 25 October, he scored his first goal as a Maple Leaf in a 4–1 loss to the visiting Boston Bruins. Pánik experienced a breakout season in Toronto, setting career-highs in games played (76), goals scored (11) and points (17). Following this noteworthy campaign, on 1 July 2015, Pánik signed a one-year, $925,000 contract with the Maple Leafs.

Pánik was expected to play with the Maple Leafs in the 2015–16 season; however, he was beaten on the depth chart by new additions such as Brad Boyes and P. A. Parenteau. Additionally, the Maple Leafs claimed defenceman Frank Corrado off waivers on 6 October 2015. Having reached the maximum roster size, Pánik was placed on waivers with the purpose of being sent down to the Toronto Marlies. Pánik cleared waivers the following day.

On 3 January 2016, after playing 32 games with the Marlies, Pánik was traded to the Chicago Blackhawks in exchange for Jeremy Morin. He finished the season with the Blackhawks and was re-signed to a one year, $875,000 contract extension. Pánik scored his first career NHL hat-trick against the Nashville Predators on 15 October 2016. Pánik tallied a career-high 22 goals and 22 assists during the  season. On 11 May 2017, he signed a two-year extension worth $2.8 million per year with the Blackhawks.

On 10 January 2018, Pánik (alongside Laurent Dauphin) was traded to the Arizona Coyotes in exchange for Anthony Duclair and Adam Clendening.

On 1 July 2019, as a free agent from the Coyotes, Pánik left to sign a four-year $11 million contract with the Washington Capitals.

During the pandemic delayed  season, on 12 April 2021, Pánik was traded at the trade deadline to the Detroit Red Wings, along with Jakub Vrána, a first-round pick in 2021, and a second-round pick in 2022, in exchange for Anthony Mantha. In closing out the regular season with the cellar-dwelling Red Wings, Pánik registered 1 goal and 4 points in 12 games.

On 16 July 2021, Pánik was traded by the Red Wings, along with a second-round pick in the 2021 NHL Entry Draft, to the New York Islanders in exchange for Nick Leddy. In the following 2021–22 season, after clearing waivers Pánik was assigned by the Islanders to AHL affiliate, the Bridgeport Islanders. He played in 28 games with the Bridgeport, recording seven goals and five assists for 12 points. He also collected one assist in four appearances in a recall with New York. On 28 March 2022, Pánik was loaned by the Islanders to the Chicago Wolves of the AHL for the remainder of the season.

On 12 October 2022, Pánik signed a one-year contract with Lausanne HC of the Swiss National League (NL).

International play
Pánik was selected to play for Slovakia at the 2010 IIHF World Championship, where he recorded two assists and finished a plus-minus rating of +3.

Pánik also represented Slovakia at the 2014 Winter Olympics in Sochi, where the nation finished in 11th in the tournament; Pánik did not record a point.

Personal life
In July 2016, Pánik married his long-time girlfriend, Nikola Kochanová.

In April 2018, Pánik was arrested after refusing to leave the entrance of Bevvy, near Scottsdale, Arizona. He was later released with criminal citation.

Career statistics

Regular season and playoffs

International

Awards and honours

References

External links
 
 
 
 

1991 births
Living people
Arizona Coyotes players
Belleville Bulls players
Bridgeport Islanders players
Chicago Blackhawks players
Chicago Wolves players
Detroit Red Wings players
Guelph Storm players
HC Oceláři Třinec players
Ice hockey players at the 2014 Winter Olympics
Lausanne HC players
New York Islanders players
Norfolk Admirals players
Olympic ice hockey players of Slovakia
Sportspeople from Martin, Slovakia
Slovak expatriate ice hockey players in Canada
Slovak expatriate ice hockey players in the Czech Republic
Slovak expatriate ice hockey players in the United States
Slovak ice hockey right wingers
Syracuse Crunch players
Tampa Bay Lightning draft picks
Tampa Bay Lightning players
Toronto Maple Leafs players
Toronto Marlies players
Washington Capitals players
Windsor Spitfires players
Slovak expatriate ice hockey players in Switzerland